The Kohlberg is a forested mountain made of quartz phyllite in northeast Bavaria, south of Arzberg (Upper Franconia).

History 
Its name comes from the old Kohlenmeilern (wood piles) used to produce charcoal for iron smelters in the Arzberg. The mountain was jocularly called the Zuckerhut (sugar hat), due to the smuggling of sugar over the old border between Bavaria and Prussia.

Structures 
On the summit is the Waldenfelswarte observation post and a refuge hut belonging to the Fichtelgebirge Club (not manned). At its southwestern foot lies the Feisnitz Reservoir and, to the northwest, the Röslau flows around the mountain.

Maps 
Fritsch Wanderkarte 1:50.000 Fichtelgebirge-Steinwald - walking map.

External links 
 On the Zuckerhut and around the mountain 

Mountains of the Fichtelgebirge
Mountains of Bavaria
Mountains under 1000 metres